John Christensen (25 May 1915 – 8 March 1996) was a Danish freestyle swimmer. He competed in two events at the 1936 Summer Olympics.

References

External links
 

1915 births
1996 deaths
Danish male freestyle swimmers
Olympic swimmers of Denmark
Swimmers at the 1936 Summer Olympics
Swimmers from Copenhagen